Ximenynic acid is trans-11-octadecen-9-ynoic acid, a long-chain acetylenic fatty acid.

It was discovered in the fruit kernels of 3 South American ximenia species (and so named). and found to have the formula C18H30O2.

It can be extracted from the fruit kernels of the Santalum obtusifolium (Sandalwood) and the Australian sandalwood Santalum spicatum

It is also found in seed oil of other plants in the Santalaceae family, including the native cherry Exocarpos cupressiformis and sweet quandong Santalum acuminatum.

Sources

Patents
It was the subject of a 2003 European patent (for use in food). The patent application was deemed withdrawn in August 2012.

Uses
It is used in some skincare products.

References

Fatty acids
Alkene derivatives
Alkyne derivatives